Kevin Finbarr Long (born 18 August 1990) is an Irish professional footballer who plays for  club Birmingham City and the Republic of Ireland national team. He plays mainly as a centre-back but can also fill in at full-back. Long began his career with Cork City before joining Burnley in 2010 as a 19-year-old. He never established himself as a regular in the Burnley side, and spent several spells out on loan, before leaving the club in 2023 to sign a short-term deal with Birmingham City.

Club career

Cork City
Long came through the Cork City youth structure, before signing on professional terms in January 2008. He played for the Cork City teams that won the FAI Youth Cup, the Munster Youth Cup and FAI Futsal Cup in 2009. Shortly after, the centre half made his senior City debut away to St Patricks Athletic coming on as a second-half substitute. Long then made his first senior start on 19 July 2009 in a home friendly against Ipswich Town, partnering Dan Murray in defence.

It was reported that Long travelled over to Preston North End for a trial, but whilst there, there was interest from League 1 sides Leeds United and Charlton Athletic and Premier League side Burnley.

Burnley
On 26 November 2009, it was announced that Burnley had fought off competition from both Everton and Celtic to get the youngster's signature, and that he was to fly in to meet up with the squad, however he would not be able to sign a full contract until the January transfer window opens. A six figure deal was agreed which would keep Long at Burnley until June 2013. On 25 January 2010, it was confirmed that Long had signed for Burnley.

Loan to Accrington Stanley
On 15 October 2010, Long joined EFL League Two side Accrington Stanley on a month-long loan deal. He has since had the loan extended till early 2011 after some excellent performances in the heart of the defence. He made his debut for the club in the 2–3 defeat to Rotherham United, but was sent off after 17 minutes for a foul on Adam Le Fondre. He returned to Burnley on 18 January 2011 after cracking a bone in his foot during a match against Cheltenham Town with a 2–1 win.

On 31 January 2011 it was confirmed that long had returned on loan at Stanley for the remainder of the season. He returned to Burnley on 23 May at the end of his loan spell having made 17 appearances.

On 5 August 2011, it was confirmed he had re-joined Stanley on a six-month loan deal. Like his first spell on loan at Accrington Stanley, Long maintained his first team status and scored his first goal of his career in a 2–2 draw against Plymouth Argyle on 8 October 2011. Long would score against Bristol Rovers, Torquay United and Macclesfield Town. He re-joined Burnley on 5 January, having made 26 appearances.

Loan to Rochdale
On 27 January 2012, Long joined Rochdale of EFL League One on an initial one-month emergency loan, where he linked up with former Accrington manager John Coleman. After playing four matches with two clean sheets during a run of two wins and a draw, Long extended his loan spell at Rochdale until the end of April. Long continued to play in the first team for the club, but the club was relegated.

Loan to Portsmouth
On 18 August 2012, Long joined EFL League One side Portsmouth on a one-month emergency loan. He made his debut in the same day, starting in a 1–1 draw against Bournemouth. In his third appearance for the club in a 4–2 loss, Long received a red card after a second bookable offence. After missing one match, Long made his return in a 3–0 win over Crawley Town on 9 September 2012 and made his last appearance in a 2–1 loss against Walsall 8 days later. The match against Walsall proved to be his last match as he suffered a back injury and his loan spell was not renewed.

Return to Burnley
He scored his first goal for Burnley in a 4–3 FA Cup defeat at Southampton on 4 January 2014. On 1 January 2015, Long made his Premier League debut with Burnley in a 3–3 draw away to Newcastle United. He replaced the injured Jason Shackell in the 17th minute, but 20 minutes later was replaced by Steven Reid after suffering an injury of his own, becoming the third Burnley player to be taken off injured in the match at St James' Park.

Loan to Barnsley

In November 2015, after regaining full fitness following his cruciate knee injury, he joined League One side Barnsley on a one-month loan deal. He scored a late winner against Oldham Athletic on his debut to help his side to a 2–1 win. However, in his second game he was sent off against Peterborough United. He went on to help Barnsley reach the EFL Trophy final after he successfully converted a penalty in the semi-final penalty shootout which was his last touch of a ball for Barnsley as he returned to Burnley the following day.

Loan to Milton Keynes Dons
On 24 March 2016, Long joined fellow Championship side Milton Keynes Dons on loan for the remainder of the 2015–16 season.

Birmingham City
In January 2023, Long signed for Championship club Birmingham City until the end of the season.

International career
In May 2017, he received his first call-up to the Republic of Ireland senior side in a 37-man squad for a training camp in Fota Island. He made the cut for the final squad for the friendlies against Mexico in New Jersey and Uruguay in Dublin. He made his debut on 1 June in the 3–1 defeat to Mexico at the MetLife Stadium, replacing John Egan as a second-half substitute.

Career statistics

Club

International

International goals
As of matches played 18 November 2020. Republic of Ireland score listed first, score column indicates score after each Long goal.

References

External links

1990 births
Living people
Association footballers from County Cork
Republic of Ireland association footballers
Republic of Ireland international footballers
Association football defenders
League of Ireland players
Cork City F.C. players
Burnley F.C. players
Accrington Stanley F.C. players
Rochdale A.F.C. players
Portsmouth F.C. players
Barnsley F.C. players
Milton Keynes Dons F.C. players
Birmingham City F.C. players
English Football League players
Premier League players
Republic of Ireland men's futsal players
Republic of Ireland expatriate association footballers
Expatriate footballers in England
Irish expatriate sportspeople in England